Pingshuang railway station is a station on the Chinese Qinghai–Tibet Railway. It was built in 1979 as a fith-class station for the China Railway Qinghai-Tibet group Co.,Ltd

References

See also
 Qinghai–Tibet Railway
 List of stations on Qinghai–Tibet railway

Railway stations in Qinghai
Stations on the Qinghai–Tibet Railway